Acontista vitrea is a species of mantis in the family Acontistidae. It was first collected from the Volcán de Chiriquí in Panama.

References

Mantodea
Articles created by Qbugbot
Insects described in 1894